The Albani lion is a 1st-century Roman green basalt lion statue with a yellow marble sphere under one paw, in the Albani Collection in the Denon Wing of the Louvre (inventory number Ma 1355) in Paris, France.

The Albani lion is possibly a reproduction of an earlier Greek bronze statue, as basalt was used in the 1st century AD for reproductions of Greek bronzes.

See also
Medici lions
Marzocco
Cultural depictions of lions
Chinese guardian lions

References

Literature
 Richard Delbrueck: Antike Porphyrwerke, Berlin/Leipzig 1932 (Studien zur spätantiken Kunstgeschichte 6), page 60 (in German, referenced on Google Books and uni-koeln.de)

Sculptures of lions
1st-century Roman sculptures
Ancient Greek and Roman sculptures of the Louvre
Basalt
Archaeological discoveries in Italy